The 13th Canadian Film Awards were held on May 13, 1961 to honour achievements in Canadian film. The ceremony was hosted by J. Alphonse Ouimet, the president of the Canadian Broadcasting Corporation.

Winners

Films
Film of the Year: Universe — National Film Board of Canada, Tom Daly producer. Colin Low and Roman Kroitor directors
Feature Film: No entries submitted
Theatrical Short: Universe — National Film Board of Canada, Tom Daly producer, Colin Low and Roman Kroitor directors
Arts and Experimental: Lines Vertical — National Film Board of Canada, Norman McLaren producer, Norman McLaren and Evelyn Lambart directors
TV Information: Armagh — Canadian Broadcasting Corporation, Phillip Hersch director
TV Entertainment: Field Trip — Canadian Broadcasting Corporation, Frank Goodship producer
Films for Children: Life in the Woodlot — National Film Board of Canada, Hugh O'Connor producer, Dalton Muir director
Travel and Recreation: Waters of the Whiteshell — Crawley Films, Peter Cock producer and director
Grey Cup Festival '60 — Chetwynd Films, Arthur Chetwynd producer and director
General Information: Marsh Harvest — Wildlife Productions, W. H. Carrick producer and director
Public Relations: Take Four Giant Steps — Pageant Productions
Sales Promotion: Hors-d'oeuvre — National Film Board of Canada, Colin Low and Victor Jobin producers, Gerald Potterton, Robert Verrall, Arthur Lipsett, Derek Lamb, Kaj Pindal and Jeff Hale directors
Training and Instruction: Epidural Anaesthesia for Vaginal Delivery in Obstetrics — Chetwynd Films, Arthur Chetwynd producer, R.A. Gordon director
Filmed Commercial, Company or Product: Not awarded
Filmed Commercial, Public Service: Mad Driver — Canadian Broadcasting Corporation
Amateur: Ringers Required — Anthony Collins producer and director
Certificate of Merit: Be Prepared — George Gingras director
Certificate of Merit: Floral Capers — John W. Ruddell director
Certificate of Merit: Italian Marble — Fred W. Borgman director
Certificate of Merit: Wake of the Bluenose — Ken Cucksey director
Special Award:
Dr. Albert Trueman, Director Canada Council — "for his contribution to the art of filmmaking and the distribution of Canadian films"

References

Canadian
Canadian Film Awards (1949–1978)
1961 in Canada